Smile Empty Soul is the debut studio album by American rock band Smile Empty Soul. The album was released on May 27, 2003 via Lava Records. Three singles were released from the album: "Bottom of a Bottle", "Silhouettes" and "Nowhere Kids". In March 2005, the album was certified gold with sales in excess of 500,000.

Track listing

Personnel
 Sean Danielsen – vocals, guitar
 Ryan Martin – bass
 Derek Gledhill – drums
 John Lewis Parker - producer
 David J. Holman - mixing

Chart performance

Certifications

See also
 List of anti-war songs

References

2003 debut albums
Smile Empty Soul albums
Lava Records albums